Safet Halilović (3 April 1951 – 10 May 2017) was a Bosnian politician and professor. He was born in Orahova, Gradiška and later attended the University of Sarajevo, graduating in 1974 from the Department of Social studies. He obtained a doctorate in politics during 1988.

Halilović was President of "Renaissance", a Bosniak cultural association, from 1990 to 1992. He was President of the Bosniak Cultural Centre, Sarajevo from 1995 to 1998. He entered politics as a member of the Party of Democratic Action. He eventually left said party to join the Party for Bosnia and Herzegovina, elected as its Secretary General in May 1996. Halilović served as Vice-President of the Federation of Bosnia and Herzegovina from February 2001 to January 2002. Then he served as the President of the Federation of Bosnia and Herzegovina from 1 January 2002 until 27 January 2003. He was also the Minister of Civil Affairs from 23 December 2002 to 11 January 2007 and then Minister of Human Rights and Refugees from 11 January 2007 until 12 January 2012.

Halilović died in Sarajevo on 10 May 2017 at the age of 66.

References

1951 births
2017 deaths
Politicians from Sarajevo
Presidents of the Federation of Bosnia and Herzegovina
Vice Presidents of the Federation of Bosnia and Herzegovina
Politicians of the Federation of Bosnia and Herzegovina
Party of Democratic Action politicians
Party for Bosnia and Herzegovina politicians
Human rights ministers of Bosnia and Herzegovina